Atar Airport or Atar International Airport  is an airport serving Atar, a town in the Adrar Region of Mauritania.

World War II
During World War II, the airport was used by the United States Army Air Forces Air Transport Command as a stopover for cargo, transiting aircraft and personnel on the North African Cairo-Dakar transport route for cargo, transiting aircraft and personnel. It connected to Dakar Airport in the South and Agadir Airport to the north.

References

External links

Airports in Mauritania
Airfields of the United States Army Air Forces Air Transport Command in North Africa
World War II airfields in Mauritania